WGH may refer to:

 WGH (AM), a radio station (1310 AM) licensed to serve Newport News, Virginia, United States
 WGH-FM, a radio station (97.3 FM) licensed to serve Newport News, Virginia
 Warren Gamaliel Harding, 29th president of the United States
 Westmorland General Hospital, a hospital in Cumbria, England